is a Japanese male volleyball player. He is a member of the Japan men's national volleyball team, playing Outside Hitter. At the club level he plays for the JTEKT Stings. Yanagida captained the senior national team from 2018 to 2021.

Career
Yanagida started playing volleyball at 7 years old under the influence of his parents. While attending  in 2010, his school participated in the 41st Spring High Tournament. He led his team to win the championships as the captain.

In 2011, he entered Keio University in the Faculty of Environment and Information studies.

He was registered as a member of Japan men's national volleyball team in 2013. In October of the same year, it was announced he would debut in the V.League (Japanese Volleyball League) with Suntory Sunbirds. He made his debut on 14 March 2015 by participating in the final 6 match against Panasonic Panthers.

On 24 April 2017 Suntory Sunbirds announced that Yanagida would leave the team at the Kurowashiki All Japan Volleyball Tournament and transfer overseas as a professional contract player.

On 21 June 2017 he announced that he would play overseas in Deutsche Volleyball-Bundesliga to Volleyball Bisons Buhl. He also signed a contract with Amuse Inc. He also entered in a contract with Asics.

On 10 April 2018 he became the captain of the Japan men's national volleyball team,  until 2020

On 8 June 2018 he extended his contract with Asics up to 31 March 2021.

On 26 July 2018 he announced on his social media that he would be signing a one-year contract with Cuprum Lubin for his debut in the Polish volleyball league, PlusLiga.

On 22 May 2019 a contract was signed with United Volleys Frankfurt, in the German league.

On 2 March 2020 he became a special advisor to the total body care brand "Doctor Air".

On 1 June 2020 he announced his comeback to the Japanese V-League through his old team, Suntory Sunbirds. On 7 June 2021 he announced that he renewed his contract with Suntory once again. 

On 30 June 2022 a contract was signed with JTEKT Stings, in the Japanese V-League.

Awards

Individual
 2009 FIVB U19 World Championship — Best Spiker
 2015–16 V.Premier League Men's — Rookie of the year
 German Bundesliga 2017/18 — Best Server
 German Cup 2017/18 — MVP
2020-21 V. League — Best 6
2021-22 V. League — Best 6
 The 70th Kurowashiki All Japan Volleyball Tournament — Best 6
2022 Asian Men's Club Volleyball Championship — Best 1st Outside Hitter
2022 Emperor's Cup — Most Valuable Player

Club
2020-21 V. League —  Champion, with Suntory Sunbirds
2021-22 V. League —  Champion, with Suntory Sunbirds
2022 Asian Men's Club Volleyball Championship —  Runner-up, with Suntory Sunbirds
2022 Emperor's Cup —  Champion, with JTEKT Stings

References

External links
 profile at FIVB.org

1992 births
Living people
Outside hitters
Sportspeople from Tokyo
Keio University alumni
Japanese men's volleyball players
Place of birth missing (living people)
Asian Games medalists in volleyball
Volleyball players at the 2014 Asian Games
Asian Games silver medalists for Japan
Japanese expatriate sportspeople in Poland
Expatriate volleyball players in Poland
Cuprum Lubin players
Medalists at the 2014 Asian Games